Loch Tay was a railway station located at the head of Loch Tay, Stirling.

History 
Opened as Loch Tay Killin Pier on 1 April 1886, the station comprised a single platform on the east side of the line. A loop was provided for running round, and the line continued north to an engine shed. Two sidings for the pier curved away to the east.

Its name was changed to Loch Tay on 1 October 1895. The station closed to passengers on 9 September 1939, however as the engine shed for the line was located here, the line remained in use.

This line was scheduled for closure on 1 November 1965, however the landslide in Glen Ogle resulted in premature closure on 27 September 1965.

References

Sources 
 

Disused railway stations in Stirling (council area)
Railway stations in Great Britain opened in 1886
Railway stations in Great Britain closed in 1939